Wycheproof is a closed railway station on the Kulwin line in Wycheproof, Victoria, Australia. The line that runs through the town, partly on the road(street running),  is unique in Victoria, as it runs through the middle of the main street. Freight trains pass through the station on their way to various locations along the line.

A number of home signals at the station were abolished on 5 January 1994.

The station and platform have recently been renovated, and in 2012, the main building was being offered for commercial lease.

A goods shed is also at the station, as well as a 70' long turntable that has been leased to Steamrail Victoria, who re-opened it to rail traffic in 2021. K class steam locomotive K167 is also statically preserved in a nearby park.

Gallery

References

External links
Photos of trains at Wycheproof, by various photographers

Disused railway stations in Victoria (Australia)
Listed railway stations in Australia
Victorian Heritage Register Loddon Mallee (region)
Shire of Buloke